The Meliolales are a fungal order in the class Sordariomycetes.

Families 
 Armatellaceae
 Meliolaceae

See also 
 List of fungal orders

References

External links 

 
Ascomycota orders
Taxa named by David Leslie Hawksworth